Manila's 2nd congressional district is one of the six congressional districts of the Philippines in the city of Manila. It has been represented in the House of Representatives of the Philippines since 1916 and earlier in the Philippine Assembly from 1907 to 1916. The district consists of barangays 147 to 267 in the eastern part of the Manila district of Tondo (also known as Gagalangin), east of Dagupan Street, Estero de Vitas and Estero de Sunog Apog. It is currently represented in the 19th Congress by Rolando M. Valeriano of the National Unity Party (NUP) and Asenso Manileño.

Representation history

Election results

2022

2019

2016

2013

2010

See also
Legislative districts of Manila

References

Congressional districts of the Philippines
Politics of Manila
1907 establishments in the Philippines
Congressional districts of Metro Manila
Constituencies established in 1907